Martha is a biblical figure.

Martha may also refer to:

People 
 Martha (given name), a given name (including a list of people and characters with the name)
 Martha, mother of Simeon Stylites the Younger, a saint of the Eastern Orthodox Church
 Saint Martha (Martyr), a 3rd-century martyr

Places
 Martha, Kentucky
 Martha, New Jersey
 Martha, Oklahoma
 Martha, Tennessee
 205 Martha, an asteroid
 St Martha's Hill, and St Martha's Church, Surrey, United Kingdom

Arts, entertainment, and media

Fictional elements
 Marthas, a class of women in  Margaret Atwood's novel The Handmaid's Tale and its television adaptation

Films
 Martha (1923 film), an American Disney short film
 Martha (1936 film), a German film directed by Karl Anton
 Martha (1967 film), a Danish film directed by Erik Balling
 Martha (1974 film), a German TV film written and directed by Rainer Werner Fassbinder

 Martha (2015 film), an American short film directed by Sam Benenati and produced by Filippo Nesci

Music
 Martha (band), punk band from Durham, UK
 Martha (opera), by Friedrich von Flotow
 Martha and the Muffins, Canadian pop group
 Martha and the Vandellas, American pop group
 "Martha My Dear", a song by The Beatles from their White Album (1968)
 "Martha", a song by Jefferson Airplane from their album After Bathing at Baxter's (1967)
 "Martha", a song by Tom Waits from his album Closing Time (1973)
 "Martha", a song by Rufus Wainwright from his album All Days Are Nights: Songs for Lulu (2010)

Television
 Martha Speaks (TV series), a 2008 children's animated sitcom
 Martha (TV series), a television talk show hosted by Martha Stewart

Other uses 
 Martha (passenger pigeon), the last passenger pigeon
 Martha (ship), several ships
 Martha organisation, a non-profit organisation based in Finland

See also

Marta (disambiguation)